James Arthur Surls (born 1943) is an American modernist artist and educator, known for his large sculptures. He founded the Lawndale Alternative Arts Space at the University of Houston in the 1970s.

Biography 
James Arthur Surls was born April 19, 1943 in Terrell, Texas. His father Joe William Surls was a carpenter and a cattle breeder. His mother Martha Lucille Surls (née Ramsey) had been made an honorary Cherokee Nation elder as one of "The Wisdom Givers". He was raised in Malakoff, Texas and spend much of his childhood helping his dad with chopping wood and building wooden structures. Surls attended Malakoff High School. After high school he attended Henderson County Junior College and transferred to a junior college in San Diego. While in San Diego he received notification of the military draft and had to return to Texas to file for deferment.

Surls earned a BS degree in 1966 from Sam Houston State University. He continued his studies and received a MFA degree in 1968 from the Cranbrook Academy of Art, where he studied sculpture under Julius Schmidt.

He taught art at Southern Methodist University, and University of Houston. Students of Surls included artists Mary Jenewein, Bernard Brunon, Peter McClennan, Robert Graham, Mark Diamond, Robert McCoy, Chris Huestis, Diane Falkenhagen, Donald Woodman, and others.

He is best known for large sculptures that are roughly hewn and derive much of their power from a close connection to nature and raw materials. His drawings and prints are largely monotone. Surls' work is particularly organic and primal. Having built a career in the 1980s and 1990s as a Texas artist, Surls relocated to a Colorado ranch and removed his work from for-profit galleries.

In 2009, five Surls bronze-and-steel bouquets were set up on Park Avenue by the New York City Parks Public Art Program and the fund for Park Avenue.

Surls has his work in various public museum collections including the Albright-Knox Art Gallery, the Cranbrook Art Museum, Dallas Museum of Art, Museum of Fine Arts, Houston, Smithsonian American Art Museum, Cleveland Museum of Art, Memphis Brooks Museum of Art, Modern Art Museum of Fort Worth, Fred Jones Jr. Museum of Art at the University of Oklahoma, Meadows Museum at Southern Methodist University, among many others.

Personal life 
Surls has three daughters from his first marriage to Martha Ann Gebhart from 1965 to 1972. His second marriage was to Linda Samuels, she was from New England and they had met at Cranbrook Academy of Art. His third marriage was in 1978 to Charmaine Locke in Liberty, Texas, she was a former student of his at Southern Methodist University.

In 1997, he moved from Splendora, Texas to Carbondale, Colorado.

See also 
 Points of View (Surls), (1991), outdoor sculpture, Houston, Texas

References

Further reading 
 Acconci, Vito, Visions of paradise, installations by Vito Acconci, David Ireland, and James Surls, March 24 through April 29, 1984, Cambridge, Mass., Massachusetts Institute of Technology, 1984.
 Auping, Michael, Structure to resemblance, work by eight American sculptors, June 13 – August 23, 1987,  Buffalo, N.Y., Albright-Knox Art Gallery, 1987.
 Graze, Sue, Visions: James Surls, 1974–1984, Dallas, Tex., Dallas Museum of Art, 1984.
 Locke, Charmaine, Leonard Shlain, and James Surls, Finding balance, reconciling the masculine/feminine in contemporary art and culture, Houston, Houston Center for Contemporary Craft, 2006.
 Sultan, Terrie & Eleanor Heartney, James Surls, the Splendora years, 1977–1997, Austin, TX, University of Texas Press, 2005.
 Surls, James, James Surls, embracing paradox, St. Louis, MO, University of Missouri-St. Louis, 2000.
 Surls, James, Jeanne Lil Chvosta, & Fronia W. Simpson, James Surls, in the Meadows and beyond, Dallas, Tex., Meadows Museum, 2004.

External links
 
Jackelope, from the Texas Archive of the Moving Image

1943 births
Living people
Sam Houston State University alumni
Cranbrook Academy of Art alumni
20th-century American sculptors
Modern sculptors
People from Montgomery County, Texas
People from Garfield County, Colorado
People from Terrell, Texas
Artists from Texas
People from Henderson County, Texas
21st-century American sculptors
Sculptors from Texas